Bereznik is a rural locality (a village) in Tarnogskoye Rural Settlement, Tarnogsky District, Vologda Oblast, Russia. The population was 13 as of 2002.

Geography 
Bereznik is located 12 km south of Tarnogsky Gorodok (the district's administrative centre) by road. Lychnaya is the nearest rural locality.

References 

Rural localities in Tarnogsky District